Lester John Holloway (born 22 July 1970) is a British journalist and editor, as well as a campaigner and local politician.

Career
Born in Shepherd's Bush, London, Holloway began his media career as a reporter for Eastern Eye, a weekly newspaper published by Ethnic Media Group, in 1999. He later became News Editor at The Voice, and was editor of the New Nation newspaper from January 2008 until January 2009, when the paper ceased production due to its parent company Ethnic Media Group going into administration.<ref name="Admin">Paul McNally & Sally Newall, "Potential buyers emerge for New Nation newspaper", Press Gazette, 23 January 2009. </ref> He was New Media Manager at the campaign group Operation Black Vote between June 2009 and March 2010.

Prior to journalism, Holloway was a local authority councillor (Labour Party) in the London Borough of Hammersmith and Fulham, between 1994 and 1998, representing the College Park and Old Oak Ward. He left the Labour Party in 2000 after nine years, and rejoined in 2017. He currently works for CLASS, the Centre for Labour and Social Studies.

In 1987, he won the BBC Radio 4/YMCA Best of British Youth Award for his campaign to save an area of natural importance called "Scrubs Wood"  in Wormwood Scrubs.

References

External links
 Lester Holloway website.
 Ian Burrell, "Lester Holloway: 'Victim stories have had their day in black papers, The Independent'', 5 May 2008
 Lester Holloway profile at The Guardian

1970 births
Black British journalists
British male journalists
British republicans
Living people
People from Shepherd's Bush